Dr. Xiaobo Yu is a Chinese palaeontologist and professor on biological sciences. Yu is credited with first describing the lobe-finned fish Psarolepis romeri, a transitional species between fish and amphibians. Yu is currently a professor at Kean University in Union, New Jersey.

References

 Yu, Xiaobo (June 1998). "A new porolepiform-like fish, Psarolepis romeri, gen. et sp. nov. (Sarcopterygii, Osteichthyes) from the Lower Devonian of Yunnan, China". Journal of Vertebrate Paleontology 18 (2): 261–274.

External links
 University Home Page of Dr. Xiaobo Yu

Chinese paleontologists
Living people
Kean University faculty
Year of birth missing (living people)